Haji Momin Khan Afridi is a Pakistani politician who has been a member of Senate of Pakistan since March 2015.

Family
He is brother of Nasir Khan Afridi.

Political career

He was elected to the Senate of Pakistan as an independent candidate in 2015 Pakistani Senate election.

References

Living people
Pakistani senators (14th Parliament)
Year of birth missing (living people)